Football was one of the tournaments at the 1928 Summer Olympics. It was won by Uruguay against Argentina, and was the last Olympic football tournament before the inception of the FIFA World Cup, which was held for the first time in 1930.

Venues

Background 
Until 1928, the Olympic football tournament had represented the World Championship of football (the 1920 (14), 1924 (22) and 1928 tournaments (17) all had greater participation than that of the first World Cup in 1930).

This presented a significant problem for the governing body, FIFA, since the tournament, though organised and run by FIFA, was an event subject to the ethical foundation that underpinned the Olympic movement.

At the time, all Olympic competitors had to maintain an amateur status, whereas professionalism was dominant in football.  Increasingly, FIFA had sought to appease those nations that required concessions in order that players could participate in the Olympics. This required there to be an acceptance that irregular payment could be made to players by national associations: the so-called 'broken time payments' by which loss of pay and expenses would be met.

On 17 February 1928, the four 'home' associations of the United Kingdom, voted unanimously to withdraw from FIFA in opposition to the manner in which the governing body was seeking to dictate on such matters and, as was noted 'that (the four Associations) be free to conduct their affairs in the way their long experience has shown them to be desirable'.

Henri Delaunay, President of the French Football Federation felt that FIFA needed to organise an international tournament outside of the Olympics.  In 1926 he stated, at the FIFA Conference: 'Today international football can no longer be held within the confines of the Olympics; and many countries where professionalism is now recognised and organised cannot any longer be represented there by their best players'.  The day before the tournament began, on 26 May 1928 the FIFA congress in Amsterdam presided over by Jules Rimet, voted that a new FIFA World Cup tournament be organised in 1930 and be open to all member nations. Italy, Sweden, the Netherlands, Spain and Uruguay would all lodge applications to host the event.

Participation 

By 1926, three years had passed since the British Associations had asked FIFA to accept their definition of what an amateur player was; FIFA had refused.  The Rome Convention was called to try to coax the British and Danes back into the fold; it proved only to distance them. Switzerland, a nation that favoured broken time payments suggested: It is not allowed to pay compensation for broken time, except in some well-circumscribed cases, to be fixed by each National Association.  This challenge to the centralised authority of FIFA was disputed by the Football Association.  In 1927 FIFA asked the Olympic committee to accept the concept of broken time payments as an overriding condition for the competing members.  The British Associations consequently withdrew from the Olympiad and a few months later withdrew from FIFA (Association Football (1960))

Uruguay were considered to be the strongest side with the Argentinians shading the advantage between the two.  Upon returning home in 1924 Uruguay had ceded to a request to play a disbelieving Argentina in a two staged contest; Argentinian fans hurling missiles at Jose Leandro Andrade to the extent that he had with adopt a position deep in-field.  The Argentinians won. Uruguay, the defending Olympic champions, once again sent a side made up, predominantly, by the personnel of their two biggest clubs: Nacional and, to a lesser degree, Peñarol.

The Europeans 
The competition was more competitive than the 1924 edition.  Ten European nations (17 in all) had made the journey to the Netherlands for the competition.  The Italians had been defeated only twice in three years.  The Italian coach, Augusto Rangone, had been a beneficiary of the national federation's decision in 1923 to permit subsidies to cover player's lost wages.  For two years his forward line had remained comparatively the same: Adolfo Baloncieri, Virgilio Levratto; even the loss of the Argentinian-Italian Julio Libonatti before the tournament was made good by the inclusion of Angelo Schiavio. Spain had been defeated once since the last Olympic Games.  After the first game, however, they lost their experienced captain Pedro Vallana.

Final tournament 
Uruguay immediately dispatched the hosts, the Netherlands, 2–0 in front of 40,000 people with none of the controversy that had surrounded their previous encounter at the 1924 Summer Olympics. The game was controlled by Jean Langenus, a performance which was recognised.  Meanwhile, the Argentinians had little difficulty against the United States winning 11–2. Elsewhere Germany were defeated by the Uruguayans 4–1.  In another quarter-final the Italians encountered Spain. In the first game they reached a tie with the Spanish fighting back from a half time deficit to force a replay.  In the replay three days later the Azzurri scored four without response before the break.  Rangone kept faith in a largely unchanged team.  Spain, on the other hand, had gambled by making five changes to Italy's two. Portugal, after wins over Chile (4–2) and Kingdom of SCS (2–1) lost to Egypt 2–1. The African side advanced to a semi-final tie against Argentina.

Bracket

Match details

Preliminary round

First round

Quarter-finals

Semifinals 
This meant that in the semi-final Italy played Uruguay. The Italians selected Giampiero Combi in goal, Angelo Schiavio, in attack.  Both would be crowned World champions at the 1934 FIFA World Cup.  In this game the Uruguayans stormed to a convincing lead by the break; Levratto's goal in the second half flattered the Italians because Uruguay ran out comfortable winners by the odd goal in 5; José Pedro Cea, Héctor Scarone scoring for the Celestes.

Bronze medal match

Gold medal match 

In the final the Uruguayans played Argentina who had trounced Egypt (clearly out of their depth against more sophisticated opposition, they conceded 6 goals to Argentina and 11 to Italy in the bronze medal match).

The final itself was a close-run affair. Both nations had been undefeated in competitive matches against other nations but had traded losses to each other since the last Olympic competition. The interest was immense.  The Dutch had received 250,000 requests for tickets from all over Europe.

Once again, there was little in it; the first game finished 1–1 and the tie went to a replay. Uruguay's Scarone converted the winner in the second half of that game.

Final

Rematch

Consolation first round 
The consolation tournament was ratified by FIFA but, as it was not organized by the Amsterdam Olympic organization, Olympic historians do not consider these matches to be part of the 
1928 Summer Olympics.

Consolation final 

 Note: The Netherlands wins after drawing of lots but the Cup was awarded to Chile

Medalists

Goalscorers 

11 goals

  Domingo Tarasconi (Argentina)

6 goals

  Manuel Ferreira (Argentina)
  Adolfo Baloncieri (Italy)

4 goals

  Roberto Cherro (Argentina)
  Raymond Braine (Belgium)
  Ali Mohamed Riad (Egypt)
  El-Tetsh (Egypt)
  Richard Hofmann (Germany)
  Elvio Banchero (Italy)
  Virgilio Levratto (Italy)
  Mario Magnozzi (Italy)
  Angelo Schiavio (Italy)
  José Maria Yermo (Spain)
  Pedro Petrone (Uruguay)

3 goals

  Raimundo Orsi (Argentina)
  Jacques Moeschal (Belgium)
  Guillermo Subiabre (Chile)
  Vítor Silva (Portugal)
  Héctor Scarone (Uruguay)

2 goals

  Juste Brouzes (France)
  Leonardus Ghering (Netherlands)
  Felix Smeets (Netherlands)
  Pepe Soares (Portugal)
  Luis Regueiro (Spain)

1 goal

  Luis Monti (Argentina)
  Florimond Vanhalme (Belgium)
  Louis Versyp (Belgium)
  Oscar Alfaro (Chile)
  Alejandro Carbonell (Chile)
  Manuel Bravo Paredes (Chile)
  Guillermo Saavedra (Chile)
  Moussa Hassan El-Ezam (Egypt)
  Ali El-Hassany (Egypt)
  Ismail El-Sayed Hooda (Egypt)
  Gamil El-Zobeir (Egypt)
  Robert Dauphin (France)
  Josef Hornauer (Germany)
  Fulvio Bernardini (Italy)
  Enrico Rivolta (Italy)
  Gino Rossetti (Italy)
  Guillaume Schutz (Luxembourg)
  Robert Theissen (Luxembourg)
  Jean-Pierre Weisgerber (Luxembourg)
  Juan Carreño (Mexico)
  Ernesto Sota (Mexico)
  Wim Tap (Netherlands)
  Valdemar Mota (Portugal)
  Augusto Silva (Portugal)
  Martín Marculeta (Spain)
  Ángel Mariscal (Spain)
  Domingo Zaldúa (Spain)
  Bekir Refet (Turkey)
  Henry Carroll (United States)
  Rudy Kuntner (United States)
  Antonio Campolo (Uruguay)
  Héctor Castro (Uruguay)
  Pedro Cea (Uruguay)
  Roberto Figueroa (Uruguay)
  Santos Urdinarán (Uruguay)
  Mirko Bonačić (Kingdom of SCS)

References

External links 

 Olympic Football Tournament Amsterdam 1928, FIFA.com
 RSSSF Archive
 Football Tournament  Amsterdam 1928

 
1928
1928 Summer Olympics events
Olympics
1928